The CinErotic FilmFest is a 3-day film festival debuting in Atlanta, Georgia over Valentine's Day weekend, February 12–14, 2010. CEFF thematically embraces "sex-positive, diverse and empowering erotic cinema and performance by independent artists, amateurs and the avant-garde" The festival features short films about sexuality, including heterosexual, bisexual, gay, lesbian, queer, kinky, poly and others, and prioritizes those that include a diverse cast of actors.

CEFF is produced by Andy Ditzler of the award-winning Film Love series, and PinkEye indie queer film salon.

The 2010 festival schedule includes 3 nights of shows: a Friday night screening of queer films, a Saturday night screening of "romantic" films, and a Sunday evening screening of BDSM-related films.

References 

Film festivals in Georgia (U.S. state)
Festivals in Atlanta